('Austrian Broadcasting Corporation'; ORF) is an Austrian national public broadcaster. Funded from a combination of television licence fee revenue and limited on-air advertising, ORF is the dominant player in the Austrian broadcast media. Austria was the last country in continental Europe after Albania to allow nationwide private television broadcasting, although commercial TV channels from neighbouring Germany have been present in Austria on pay-TV and via terrestrial overspill since the 1980s.

History of broadcasting in Austria 

The first unregulated test transmissions in Austria began on 1 April 1923 by Radio Hekaphon, run by the radio pioneer and enthusiast Oskar Czeija (de; 1887–1958), who applied for a radio licence in 1921; first in his telephone factory in the Brigittenau district of Vienna, later in the nearby TGM technical college. On 2 September, it aired a first broadcast address by Austrian President Michael Hainisch (1858–1940). One year later, a powerful transmitter, designed by the German Telefunken company, was installed on the roof of the former War Ministry building in Ringstraße in central Vienna.

Radio Verkehrs AG 
It was, however, the public  ('Radio Communication Company Ltd', RAVAG), a joint-venture of the Austrian Federal Government, the City of Vienna and several bank companies, which, in February 1924, was awarded the concession to begin broadcasting, with Czeja as its director-general. By the end of October 1924 it already had 30,000 listeners, and by January 1925 100,000.

Radio programmes aimed at an educated audience, featuring classical music, literature and lectures. The first outside broadcasts aired in 1925, transmitted from the Vienna State Opera and the Salzburg Festival. On the other hand, news broadcasts only played a minor part out of deference to the Austrian press and the 'neutralism' policy of the federal government (the July Revolt of 1927 was not even mentioned). Nevertheless, also regular sportscasts began 1928 and in 1930 the Austrian legislative election was comprehensively covered. At that time, RAVAG registered about 500,000 listeners, having become a mass medium.

In the course of the abolition of the First Austrian Republic and the implementation of the Austrofascist Ständestaat by Chancellor Engelbert Dollfuß in 1934, the  studios were embattled during the Austrian Civil War in February, as well as by the protagonists of the Nazi July Putsch, when several insurgents entered the studio and had Dollfuß's resignation announced (he actually was killed in his occupied Chancellery office). Dollfuß's successor Kurt Schuschnigg (1897–1977) had the demolished broadcasting centre replaced by the new  building (present-day ) near the Theresianum academy in Wieden, Vienna, designed by Clemens Holzmeister (1886–1983) and erected from 1935 to 1939. The Austrian government widely used RAVAG broadcasts for propaganda activities, defying massive cross-border Nazi propaganda broadcasts aired from German transmitters in the Munich region, but also promoted the live transmission of mass celebrations.

With the Austrian Anschluss to Nazi Germany and the invasion of Wehrmacht troops in 1938, RAVAG was dissolved and replaced by  subordinate to the national Reichs-Rundfunk-Gesellschaft network ( from 1939) in Berlin, were also the programmes were produced. One of the last RAVAG transmissions was Schuschnigg's farewell address on 11 March 1938 ('God Save Austria'). Only hours later, live broadcasts featured the cheering devotees of his Nazi successor Arthur Seyss-Inquart (1892–1946), the triumphant entry of Adolf Hitler in Linz the next day, and his speech on Heldenplatz in Vienna. In 1939, the former RAVAG transmission facilities were taken over by the German Reichspost.

In World War II, listening to Feindsender ('enemy radio stations') became a capital offence, however, such stations such as the Swiss Radio Beromünster as well as the German-language programmes of the BBC, Voice of America (VOA) and Vatican Radio, were widely used information sources.  transmissions were important for strategic bombing alerts. The  broadcasting centre itself was damaged by Allied bombs in January and February 1945, followed by the Red Army Vienna Offensive.  last aired 6 April, before retiring Schutzstaffel troops blew up the Bisamberg transmitter.

Following the Wehrmacht defeat, independent Austrian RAVAG radio broadcasting resumed in Allied-occupied Austria 24 April 1945, when it announced the formation of a provisional Austrian state government led by Karl Renner (1870–1950). The RAVAG/Radio Wien transmissions were limited to the Eastern Austrian Soviet occupation zone, and as the Cold War progressed was increasingly considered Communist propaganda broadcasting.

A number of other radio stations began broadcasting in the different occupation zones and radio become a popular medium among Austrians: in 1952 there were 1.5 million radio sets in Austrian homes. The Western Allies could operate their programmes nationwide from Vienna, with a significantly higher popularity rating than the outdated RAVAG transmissions.

Radio channels 
 Ö1 – ORF's cultural and principal news channel
 Hitradio Ö3 – pop music channel
 FM4 – channel for (alternative) youth culture

The former Ö2 has been replaced by nine regional channels (one for each Bundesland, or federal state):

 Radio Burgenland
 Radio Kärnten
 Radio Niederösterreich
 Radio Oberösterreich
 Radio Salzburg
 Radio Steiermark
 Radio Tirol
 Radio Vorarlberg
 Radio Wien
 Radio Slovenski

All of these radio channels are broadcast terrestrially on FM and via the digital service of the SES Astra satellites at 19.2° east.

All of ORF's domestic radio channels are also streamed over the internet. An extra 24-hour all-news channel is available exclusively via internet: this is Ö1 Inforadio which relays all of Ö1's news content and fills the 'gaps', during which Ö1 is transmitting music and cultural programmes, with additional news broadcasts.

A version of Ö1 is broadcast internationally via short wave (and satellite in Europe) as Ö1 International. Its schedule includes a small number of programmes in English and Spanish.

An additional service, Radio 1476, formerly broadcast on medium wave each evening from 18.00 until just after midnight. Its schedule was a mixture of items from Ö1, programmes for linguistic and cultural minorities, folk music, and special productions.

Television channels 
 ORF 1
 ORF 2 (with regional programmes)
 ORF 2 Europe
 ORF III
 ORF Sport +
 3sat (in association with ARD, ZDF and SRF)

The ORF television channels are broadcast terrestrially and via the SES Astra 1H satellite at 19.2° east. Via satellite ORF 1 and ORF2 are encrypted, allowing only Austrian residents who pay the Austrian television licence ( (GIS)) to watch them. ORF2 Europe is unencrypted and receivable via satellite in Europe.

ORF is a supporter of the Hybrid Broadcast Broadband TV (HbbTV) initiative that is promoting and establishing an open European standard for hybrid set-top boxes for the reception of broadcast TV and broadband multimedia applications with a single user interface. From 6 March 1995 ORF broadcasts 24 hours a day.

Regional studios 

The ORF has one regional studio in each state, where each state produces its own radio and state television, which is broadcast over ORF2. The regional studio in Tyrol, also produces regional television and radio for the German-speaking population of South Tyrol, Italy. Even though each state has its own studio, most ORF productions are heavily focused on Vienna, since most shows are made there.

Major stars 
Many of Austria's best known TV stars work for ORF. Mirjam Weichselbraun, a former MTV presenter is co-host of Dancing Stars, Austria's edition of Dancing With the Stars. The most popular comedy show on ORF is Wir sind Kaiser ('We Are Emperor') with comedian Robert Palfrader playing Emperor Robert Heinrich I, inviting celebrity guests to make fun of them.

Logos 
The ORF's first corporate logo, called the 'ORF eye', was designed by the Austrian illustrator and cartoonist Erich Sokol in 1968, who also served as ORF's chief graphics artist and later as art director from 1967 until 1992. The 'ORF eye' logo is often compared to the 'CBS Eye' logo used by the American commercial broadcaster CBS. In 1992, ORF commissioned the British graphic designer Neville Brody to design its current corporate logo, which was soon nicknamed the 'ORF bricks'. The 1968 'ORF eye' logo however continued to be used sporadically (for example on the title cards of Zeit im Bild) until it was completely phased out in 2011.

See also 
 Vienna Radio Symphony Orchestra

References

External links 

 Official website 
 Official corporate website 
 
 

 
Radio in Austria
Television in Austria
Publicly funded broadcasters
German-language television networks
European Broadcasting Union members
1955 establishments in Austria
Organizations established in 1955
State media
Austrian news websites